The alpha-2B adrenergic receptor (α2B adrenoceptor), is a G-protein coupled receptor. It is a subtype of the adrenergic receptor family. The human gene encoding this receptor has the symbol ADRA2B.
ADRA2B orthologs have been identified in several mammals.

Receptor 

α2-adrenergic receptors include 3 highly homologous subtypes: α2A, α2B, and α2C. These receptors have a critical role in regulating neurotransmitter release from sympathetic nerves and from adrenergic neurons in the central nervous system.

Clinical significance 

This gene encodes the α2B subtype, which was observed to associate with eIF-2B, a guanine nucleotide exchange protein that functions in regulation of translation. A polymorphic variant of the α2B subtype, which lacks 3 glutamic acids from a glutamic acid repeat element, was identified to have decreased G protein-coupled receptor kinase-mediated phosphorylation and desensitization; this polymorphic form is also associated with reduced basal metabolic rate in obese subjects and may therefore contribute to the pathogenesis of obesity. This gene contains no introns in either its coding or untranslated sequences.

A deletion variant of the α2B adrenergic receptor has been shown to be related to emotional memory in Europeans and Africans. This variant also predisposed people who had it to focus more on negative aspects of a situation. This predisposition remained present in people with the variant gene who took a single dose of the noradrenergic antidepressant reboxetine, but was weakened in people without the variant.

Evolution 

The ADRA2B gene (sometimes referenced as A2AB) is used in animals as a nuclear DNA phylogenetic marker. This intronless gene has first been used to explore the phylogeny of the major groups of mammals, and contributed to reveal that placental orders are distributed into four major clades: Xenarthra, Afrotheria, Laurasiatheria, and Euarchontoglires. Comparative analysis of the primary protein sequence of ADRA2B across placentals also showed the high conservation of residues thought to be involved in agonist binding and in G protein–coupling. However, great variations are observed in the very long, third intracellular loop, with a polyglutamyl domain displaying pervasive length differences.

Ligands
 Agonists
 (−)-Dibromophakellin

 Antagonists
 Imiloxan
 Yohimbine

See also 
Adrenergic receptor

References

External links

Further reading 

 
 
 
 
 
 
 
 
 
 
 
 
 
 
 
 
 
 
 
 

Adrenergic receptors